Víctor Arturo Coello Paz (born 29 July 1974 in Villanueva, Honduras) is a Honduran former footballer who played as goalkeeper.

Club career
On 22 December 1993, Coello made his domestic league debut with Marathón in a 1-1- draw against Deportes Progreseño. In summer 2009 he moved to Deportes Savio. He joined Platense before the 2010 Apertura championship.

In January 2013, Coello signed a six-month deal with second division side Juticalpa in their bid to win promotion to the top tier.

International career
Coello made his debut for Honduras in an April 1997 UNCAF Nations Cup match against Panama and has earned a total of 33 caps, scoring no goals. He has represented his country in 1 FIFA World Cup qualification match and played at the 1997, 2003, 2005 and 2007 UNCAF Nations Cups as well as at the 2003 and 2005 CONCACAF Gold Cups.

His final international was a February 2007 UNCAF Nations Cup match against Panama.

Personal life
He is married to Marlene and the couple have a daughter, Abigail. He hopes to retire from football at age 40.

Honours

Player
C.D. Marathón
Liga Profesional de Honduras: 2001–02 C, 2002–03 C, 2004–05 A, 2007–08 A, 2008–09 A
Platense F.C.
Liga Profesional de Honduras: 2000–01 C

References

External links

1974 births
Living people
People from Cortés Department
Association football goalkeepers
Honduran footballers
Honduras international footballers
2003 UNCAF Nations Cup players
2003 CONCACAF Gold Cup players
2005 UNCAF Nations Cup players
2005 CONCACAF Gold Cup players
2007 UNCAF Nations Cup players
C.D. Marathón players
Platense F.C. players
Deportes Savio players
Liga Nacional de Fútbol Profesional de Honduras players